Earl of Shelburne is a title that has been created two times while the title of Baron Shelburne has been created three times. The Shelburne title was created for the first time in the Peerage of Ireland in 1688 when Elizabeth, Lady Petty, was made Baroness Shelburne. She was the wife of the noted economist Sir William Petty. The title was for life only and became extinct on her death in circa 1708. On the same day that Lady Shelburne was elevated to the peerage, her eldest son by Sir William Petty, Charles Petty, was also raised to the Peerage of Ireland as Baron Shelburne. He died young in 1696, when the title became extinct. The barony was created for a third time in the Peerage of Ireland in 1699 in favour of the Hon. Henry Petty, younger son of Sir William Petty and Lady Shelburne. In 1719 he was further honoured when he was made Viscount Dunkerron and Earl of Shelburne, also in the Peerage of Ireland. On his death in 1751 these titles also became extinct.

The Petty estates were inherited by the late Earl's nephew, the Hon. John Fitzmaurice. He was the second son of the Hon. Anne Petty, daughter of Sir William Petty and Lady Shelburne and sister of the Earl of Shelburne, and her husband Thomas Fitzmaurice, 1st Earl of Kerry. He assumed by Act of Parliament the surname of Petty on succeeding to his maternal uncle's estates in 1751 and the same year he was raised to the Peerage of Ireland as Baron Dunkeron and Viscount FitzMaurice. In 1753 the earldom was also revived when he was made Earl of Shelburne in the Peerage of Ireland. For further history of these titles, see the Marquess of Lansdowne.

Barons Shelburne (1688)
Elizabeth Petty, 1st Baroness Shelburne (died )

Barons Shelburne (1688)
Charles Petty, 1st Baron Shelburne (–1696)

Earls of Shelburne (1719)
Henry Petty, 1st Earl of Shelburne (1675–1751)

Earls of Shelburne (1751)
see the Marquess of Lansdowne

Notes

References
Kidd, Charles, Williamson, David (editors). Debrett's Peerage and Baronetage (1990 edition). New York: St Martin's Press, 1990, 

Earldoms in the Peerage of Ireland
Extinct earldoms in the Peerage of Ireland

 
Noble titles created in 1719
Noble titles created in 1751